The  is an electric multiple unit (EMU) train type operated by the private railway  operator Semboku Rapid Railway in Japan on Semboku Liner limited express services between  and  in Osaka Prefecture since 27 January 2017.

Design
Based on the Nankai 12000 series EMU design introduced in 2011 on Nankai Main Line Southern services, the Semboku 12000 series sports a gold livery and has different coloured seat covers in each of the four cars.

Operations

Formation
The 12000 series is a four-car trainset, accommodating a total of 242 seated passengers. It is formed as follows, with two driving motor ("Mc") cars and two non-powered intermediate trailer ("T") cars. Car 1 is at the Izumi-Chuo end.

Cars 1 and 4 each have one PT7144-B2 single-arm pantograph.

Interior
Passenger accommodation consists of 2+2-abreast unidirectional seating, and each car has different colour seats, with red, green, purple, and yellow seat covers. LED lighting is used, and passenger information displays provide information in four languages.

Car 1 has a wheelchair space and also toilet facilities, including a urinal, a women-only toilet, a universal access toilet, and a washing area. A drink vending machine is located in car 4,

History
Initial details of the new train on order were announced in October 2016. The four-car trainset, 12021, was delivered from the J-TREC factory in Yokohama to Wakayamashi in October 2016.

The trainset entered revenue service on 27 January 2017, following an official send-off ceremony at Izumi-Chūō Station.

References

External links

 Semboku Railway news release 

Electric multiple units of Japan
Train-related introductions in 2017
Rail transport in Osaka Prefecture
Semboku Rapid Railway

ja:南海12000系電車#泉北高速鉄道12000系
1500 V DC multiple units of Japan
J-TREC multiple units